Guarany Futebol Clube, commonly known as Guarany, is a Brazilian football club based in Camaquã, Rio Grande do Sul state.

History
The club was founded on February 12, 1946, by former players of Atlético Camaqüense. The club was then named after Guarany of Bagé.

Stadium
Guarany Futebol Clube play their home games at Estádio Coronel Sílvio Luz. The stadium has a maximum capacity of 3,000 people.

References

External links
 Official website

Association football clubs established in 1946
Football clubs in Rio Grande do Sul
1946 establishments in Brazil